Lower Kintore is a Canadian settlement, founded by Scottish immigrants.

In the Köppen climate classification, Lower Kintore has a warm-summer humid continental climate

In 1909, a church was built. In the 1873–74 academic year, the Lower Kintore school district received  from a New Brunswick Legislature grant for education, though for the 1901–02 academic year, the district had no classes because the schoolhouse needed replacing.

References

populated places in Victoria County, New Brunswick